

Sponsorship

Club

Coaching staff
{|class="wikitable"
|-
!Position
!Staff
|-
|Manager|| Rene Desaeyere
|-
|rowspan="2"|Assistant Manager|| U Aung Myint Tun
|-
| U Zaw Lay Aung
|-
|Goalkeeper Coach||
|-
|Fitness Coach|| Joseph Ronald D'Angelus
|-

Other information

|-

2015 AFC History

General Aung San Shield

Squad information

First team squad

Transfers

In:

Out:

References

 Yadanarbon FC

External links
 First Eleven Journal in Burmese
 Soccer Myanmar in Burmese

Myanmar National League